FK Varoš is a football club based in Prilep, North Macedonia. They currently playing in the OFS Prilep Division B league.

History
The club was founded in 1939.

In one time it competed in the Macedonian Second League.

References

External links
Varoš Facebook 
Club info at MacedonianFootball 
Football Federation of Macedonia 

Varoš
Association football clubs established in 1939
1939 establishments in Yugoslavia